Addin Fonua-Blake (born 6 November 1995) is a professional rugby league footballer who plays as a  for the New Zealand Warriors in the NRL. He has played for both Tonga and New Zealand at international level. 

He previously played for the Manly Warringah Sea Eagles in the National Rugby League.

Background
Fonua-Blake was born in Meadowbank, New South Wales, Australia. He is of New Zealand and Tongan descent. 

He played his junior rugby league for the Mascot Jets, before being signed by the South Sydney Rabbitohs.

Playing career

Early career
After playing lower grades with the South Sydney Rabbitohs in 2011 and Parramatta Eels in 2012, Fonua-Blake joined the St. George Illawarra Dragons in 2013. In 2013 and 2014, he played for St. George Illawarra's NYC team. 

In 2014, he co-captained the side. On 2 September 2014, he was named on the interchange bench in the 2014 NYC Team of the Year. 

On 18 October 2014, he played for the Junior Kiwis against the Junior Kangaroos, before re-signing with St. George Illawarraon a contract to the end of 2016. On 19 January 2015, he was stood down by the club due to disciplinary reasons, before having his contract terminated on 30 June 2015 when he pleaded guilty to assaulting his girlfriend. At the end of 2015, he was granted approval by the NRL to train with the Manly Warringah Sea Eagles from 1 November of the same year.

2016
After playing in five Intrust Super Premiership NSW matches for the Manly-Warringah club, Fonua-Blake was cleared to be eligible to play in the NRL after satisfying the NRL Integrity Unit that he had completed a comprehensive off-field counselling and development program. This allowed him to make his NRL debut for Manly-Warringah against the Parramatta Eels in Round 7 of the 2016 NRL season.

On 7 September, following the end to Manly's season (having finished 13th), Fonua-Blake was named in the New Zealand Kiwis train-on squad for the 2016 Four Nations tournament. Later on the same day, he won the Ken Arthurson Award as Manly's 2016 Rookie of the Year. He played in 14 games for Manly-Warringah in 2016, crossing for 2 tries (a double against the defending premiers North Queensland in Townsville).

2017
Fonua-Blake made 22 appearances for Manly in 2017 as the club finished 6th on the table and qualified for the finals.  Fonua-Blake played in the elimination final against the Penrith Panthers which Penrith controversially won 22-12 as Tyrone Peachey scored the match winning try although replays had shown the player knocked the ball forwards with his hands.

2018
Fonua-Blake made 24 appearances for Manly in 2018.  The club endured a horror season on and off the field narrowly avoiding the club's first wooden spoon by 2 competition points.

2019
Fonua-Blake made 22 appearances for Manly in the 2019 NRL season as the club finished sixth on the table.  Fonua-Blake scored a try in Manly's week one elimination final victory over Cronulla at Brookvale Oval.  Fonua-Blake played in Manly's elimination final defeat against South Sydney at ANZ Stadium the following week which ended their season.

2020
In round 8 of the 2020 NRL season, Fonua-Blake was sent off after full-time in the match against Newcastle after he called referee Grant Atkins a "fucking retard", and later a "spasticc". Fonua-Blake said this in response to Manly being denied a penalty try in the final moments of the match, which resulted in a 14-12 loss to the Newcastle Knights at Brookvale Oval.

On 16 September, Fonua-Blake handed in a transfer request despite having two years left on his contract.  Fonua-Blake cited wanting to relocate out of Sydney with his young family for the decision.

On 22 September, he announced via his Instagram account that he has agreed to join the New Zealand Warriors from the 2021 NRL season, with Manly having agreed to terminate the remainder of his contract.

2021
Fonua-Blake played 15 games for New Zealand in the 2021 NRL season as the club missed the finals finishing 12th.

2022
On 26 May, it was announced that Fonua-Blake would be ruled out indefinitely from playing with a foot injury.

He made a total of 21 appearances for the New Zealand Warriors in the 2022 NRL season as they finished 15th on the table.

In October 2022 he was named in the Tonga squad for the 2021 Rugby League World Cup.

Assault charge

In 2015 he pleaded guilty to assault charges after pushing and kicking his partner after a night out drinking. He was fined $1000, ordered to undergo counselling and given a one year suspended sentence. 

His contract with St. George was also terminated.

References

External links

Manly Sea Eagles profile
 Manly-Warringah Sea Eagles profile

1995 births
Living people
Australian people of New Zealand descent
Australian sportspeople of Tongan descent
Australian rugby league players
Illawarra Cutters players
Junior Kiwis players
Manly Warringah Sea Eagles players
New Zealand national rugby league team players
New Zealand Warriors players
Rugby league players from Sydney
Rugby league props
Tonga national rugby league team players